In the United Kingdom, regional development agencies (RDAs) were nine non-departmental public bodies established for the purpose of development, primarily economic, of England's Government Office regions between 1998 and 2010.  There was one RDA for each of the NUTS level 1 regions of England. Similar activities were carried out in Wales by the Welsh Government Department of Economy and Transport, in Northern Ireland by the Department of Enterprise, Trade and Investment and in Scotland by Scottish Enterprise and Highlands and Islands Enterprise.

In June 2010 the UK government announced the abolition of the RDAs which took place on 31 March 2012, with a view to reducing the government deficit; similar economic development would be undertaken by local councils and local enterprise partnerships (LEPs). There was no direct replacement for the RDAs as LEPs did not at first receive funding from central government, and local councils did not receive an equivalent injection of income from central funds, having been called upon to make savings and support similar initiatives.

Background
Eight RDAs were created on 25 November 1998 following the Regional Development Agencies Act 1998. In subsequent years their scope and powers were enhanced, and a ninth agency, for London, was established in July 2000. The statutory objectives of the RDAs were:
 to further economic development and regeneration;
 to promote business efficiency and competitiveness;
 to promote employment;
 to enhance the development and application of skills relevant to employment, and
 to contribute to sustainable development.

They took over responsibility from Government Offices for administering European Union regional development funds.

Funding
The RDAs were funded from HM Treasury via six central government departments:
Department for Business, Innovation and Skills
Department for Communities and Local Government
Department for Energy and Climate Change
Department for Environment, Food and Rural Affairs
Department for Culture, Media and Sport
UK Trade and Investment

The funding from these departments was pooled, and then allocated to the individual RDAs.  The total funding known as the 'Single Pot' was as below.
2006/2007 — £2.244 billion
2007/2008 — £2.297 billion
2008/2009 — £2.193 billion
2009/2010 — £2.260 billion
2010/2011 — £1.760 billion

In 2009 a study by accountants PriceWaterhouseCoopers showed that RDAs were generating £1 for the local economy for every £1 of public spending, though this figure was estimated to rise to £4.50 when long-term investments in infrastructure matured.

Structure
Eight of the nine RDAs reported to the Department for Business, Innovation and Skills (BIS), the exception being the London Development Agency (LDA), which reported directly to the Mayor of London and the London Assembly.

Each RDA was led by a chair and a board of 15 people, appointed by BIS ministers (except in London, where the mayor appointed). The RDA chairs were all business people, while the boards were made up of representatives of business, local government, trade unions and voluntary organisations.

The day-to-day running of the RDA was the responsibility of the Chief Executive who was appointed by the board, subject to approval by BIS ministers (or the London Mayor in the case of the LDA).

Operation
The objectives of the RDAs were set out in the Regional Economic Strategy (RES) of each region.  The RES was a document created and maintained by the RDA for the whole region, i.e. it was not simply a document to guide the RDA, it was intended to guide the work of other organisations also.  Each RDA updated their RES on a regular basis (approximately every three years) by consulting widely with their partners, and stakeholders in the region, including local government, voluntary organisations, private organisations, and other interested groups. The RES was submitted to the Department for Business, Innovation and Skills for formal approval.

The RDAs sought to achieve their objectives in a variety of ways.  The most obvious of these was by funding projects aimed at addressing them, either directly from the RDA, or indirectly through a funded body.  Secondly, they sought to influence other stakeholders in the region to take action themselves.  Thirdly, they sought to influence the policies of central government where they might impact on the region.

The RDAs worked together in a number of areas, with different RDAs taking the 'lead' role in varying policy areas. Additionally, the RDAs jointly funded a central secretariat to co-ordinate this activity. Finally, the three northern RDAs (Northwest Regional Development Agency, Yorkshire Forward and One NorthEast) collaborated on The Northern Way.

Each RDA had a science and industry council (SIC) made up of business, university and public sector experts. Each SIC advised its RDA on science and innovation investments. Each region had a slightly different focus, but all SICs contributed to the national Technology Strategy (owned by the Technology Strategy Board). This was done via a strategic advisory group on which the chairs of each science and industry council sat.

Abolition and replacement
Following the June 2010 "emergency" budget, the coalition government announced its intention to replace the RDAs by smaller-scale partnerships between local authorities and businesses, known as local enterprise partnerships (LEPs). The RDAs were abolished on 31 March 2012.

List
The Regional Development Agencies were:
East of England Development Agency (EEDA), based in Cambridge
East Midlands Development Agency (EMDA), based in Nottingham
London Development Agency (LDA)
One NorthEast (ONE), based in Newcastle
Northwest Regional Development Agency, based in Warrington
South West of England Regional Development Agency, based in Exeter
South East England Development Agency (SEEDA), based in Guildford
Advantage West Midlands, based in Birmingham
Yorkshire Forward, based in Leeds

References

External links
England's RDAs
Department for Business, Enterprise and Regulatory Reform - England's Regional Development Agencies: Introduction

 
Economy of England
Local government in England